The 1974–75 Série A season was the 54th season of the Série A, the top level of ice hockey in France. Sporting Hockey Club Saint Gervais won their third league title.

Final ranking
 1st place: Sporting Hockey Club Saint Gervais
 2nd place: Ours de Villard-de-Lans
 3rd place: Gap Hockey Club
 4th place: Chamonix Hockey Club
 5th place: CSG Grenoble
 6th place: Club des Sports de Megève
 7th place: Viry-Châtillon Essonne Hockey
 8th place: CPM Croix
 9th place: Français Volants
 10th place: Diables Rouges de Briançon

External links
List of French champions on hockeyarchives.info

France
1974–75 in French ice hockey
Ligue Magnus seasons